M1NT is a nightclub business originally set-up in London in 2004 by Alistair Paton [(www.alistairpaton.com)] who has a net worth of US$35m, but currently their one and only venue is located in Shanghai. The first M1NT was a private members club in the Knightsbridge district of London.  Whilst opening to great publicity due to its then unique business model of allow members to own the business, the project was short-lived due to M1NT's landlord (Ramsay Holdings, owned by television chef and restaurateur Gordon Ramsay) closing his adjoining restaurant Pengelley's.

M1NT pioneered the collective ownership model in the F&B sector and employed over 1,200 staff with a rumored turnover of US$70m p/a in 2014. The average annual shareholder dividend exceed 14% from 2006 to 2014 following the groups focus on having an Asian presence.

M1NT Shanghai received best club, cocktails, venue, service and design industry awards from 2008 to 2018, as well as local media awards each year until the group got aggressively taken over by SINO Group in 2014 who got removed the collective ownership aspect that had made the success of this venture so far with no regard for minority foreign shareholders.

In 2012 M1NT launched M1NT Cellars, which is a premier wine shop in Shanghai that presents the M1NT luxury experience online and offline, offering authentic imported wines, spirits, and beer. With a physical store and online presence, M1NT Cellars allowed customers across China, especially in Shanghai to buy wine online.

This business grew so large its volumes exceeded that of the physical business and it became one of the largest online retail liquor distributors in Mainland China. The Sino Group and their wholesale liquor partners Unify Talent Ltd re-established their market share by closing M1NT Cellars following their takeover of the Company and replacing Founder Alistair Paton with 26 year old Ting Lee daughter of Wilson Lee who is also the owner of Noah Group.

In what was described by Paton's lawyers Skaden Hong Kong as a 'brutal hostile takeover' M1NT Shanghai like many foreign companies prior was assumed by Mainland Nationals without grounds for recourse from its foreign shareholders. Tactics deployed in the takeover were reportedly severe enough to deter Senior Executives from returning to Mainland China.

Outside of Greater China the M1NT brand remains owned by Alistair Paton with reports of resort projects being considered in Vietnam, Bali and Sri Lanka from 2020.

References

Nightclubs in London
Nightclubs
Music venues in China
Companies based in Shanghai
Buildings and structures in Shanghai